Nenad Žugaj (born 19 April 1983 in Zagreb) is a male wrestler from Croatia. He had started wrestling at the age of ten.

He attended a sports gymnasium.  After graduation, he has been studying at the Faculty of Kinesiology and in 2007 became professor of kinesiology.

In the same year he enrolled in officer school, becoming a lieutenant of the Croatian Armed Forces.

In senior competition, Nenad wrestles in the 84 kg Greco-Roman category.  His first club was the wrestling club “Hrvatski dragovoljac“ and he is now a member of wrestling club, "Lika".

His best achievement, so far, is a bronze medal at the 2010 World Championship in Moscow.  He has also won a Mediterranean Games gold medal in 2009 in Pescara.  He has also won a bronze at the European Championships and a bronze at the Mediterranean Games.

His twin brother Neven Žugaj is also a Greco-Roman wrestler competing for Croatia.

In Semifinals at the European Games 2015 he was eliminated by Davit Chakvetadze of Russia.

He competed at the 2012 Olympics in Greco-Roman wrestling in the under-84kg category, winning 14th place.

References

External links
 Biography on fila-wrestling.com
 Official website
 sports-reference.com
 London 2012 profile
 Zagrebački blizanci izborili nastup na OI u Londonu 

Living people
1983 births
Sportspeople from Zagreb
Croatian male sport wrestlers
Wrestlers at the 2012 Summer Olympics
Olympic wrestlers of Croatia
Twin sportspeople
Croatian twins
Croatian army officers
European Games competitors for Croatia
Wrestlers at the 2015 European Games

World Wrestling Championships medalists
Mediterranean Games gold medalists for Croatia
Mediterranean Games bronze medalists for Croatia
Competitors at the 2009 Mediterranean Games
Competitors at the 2013 Mediterranean Games
Mediterranean Games medalists in wrestling
20th-century Croatian people
21st-century Croatian people